Gerrit Schoonhoven (27 September 1958 – 20 October 2020), was a South African filmmaker, television director and actor. He is best known for directing the soapie Binnelanders.

Personal life
Schoonhoven was born on 27 September 1958 in South Africa. In 1981, he graduated with an honors degree in drama from the University of Potchefstroom (UOP). After the graduation, he became a lecturer in drama at the same university in 1985.

He was married to Marius Meyer where the wedding was celebrated on 27 September 2020.

He died on 20 October 2020 at the age of 62 due to cancer.

Career
In 1980 while studying at UOP, he acted in Rob Antonissen’s translation into Afrikaans of Mariken van Nieumeghen. In 1982, he joined with Performing Arts Council of the Transvaal (PACT) and continued to perform in theatre until 1985 in the plays such as; Die Vasvat van 'n Feeks and Die Keiser. In 1980s, he became a director at the ATKV Kampustoneel, where he directed the production We All Fall Down. Meanwhile, he also designed the lighting with Patrick Curtis. In 1988, he compiled and directed the play Piekniek. After that, he joined with the theatre group called Performing Arts Council of the Orange Free State (PACOFS) from 1986 to 1987. In 1987, he won the Rosalie van der Gucht Prize for New Directors. Later he won the Fleur du Cap for Best New Director for directing the critics acclaimed play Somewhere on the Border.

In 1997, he performed in the stage plays such as; Anna van Wyk and Endgame. In 1999, he performed in the play Antony and Cleopatra at Grahamstown Festival. Since that, he directed several stage plays such as; Onderhoud met 'n Bobbejaan and Hond se Gedagte in 1985, Somewhere on the Border for the Grahamstown Festival in 1986, Spooks in 1986, Beckett and Kinderspeletjies in 1987, and Huise Vol Uile and Diesel and Dust in 1989. In 1991, he directed the play n Koffer in die Kas and then the play Sleeping with Alice in 1996. Later, he wrote the one-act stage play Trajek van Tralies.

In 2005, he became the director of kykNET soap opera Binnelanders, where he continued to direct the soapie for more than 15 years. In 2006, he won the SA Akademie vir Wetenskap en Kuns honorary award for Afrikaans television. Then in the next year, he won the awaard for the Best Director for directing the television serial Orion. Since 2014, he worked in the panel of judges for the kykNET Rapport Book Prize under fiction section. In 2016, he directed the film Twee Grade van Moord which was released nationwide on 22 July 2016. In 2021, he was posthumously awarded Best Achievement in Directing at the 15th annual South African Film and Television Awards (SAFTA).

Filmography

References

External links
 IMDb

1958 births
2020 deaths
South African male film actors
South African male television actors
South African male stage actors
Afrikaner people
Deaths from cancer in South Africa